The Manchester Subdivision is a railroad line owned by CSX Transportation in the U.S. state of Georgia. At its north end it continues south from the Atlanta Terminal Subdivision and at its south end it continues south as the Fitzgerald Subdivision of the Jacksonville Division.

See also
 List of CSX Transportation lines
 Atlanta, Birmingham and Atlantic Railroad

References

CSX Transportation lines